Lej da Gravatscha is an artificial lake next to the Inn River near Bever in the Upper Engadin, Grisons, Switzerland.

External links
Hiking trip to Lake Gravatscha/Lej da Gravatscha

Lakes of Graubünden
Gravatscha
Engadin
Bever, Switzerland